Tefé may refer to:

Tefé, municipality in the state of Amazonas, Brazil
Tefé River, river in  the state of Amazonas, Brazil
Tefé Airport, airport in Amazonas, Brazil
Roman Catholic Territorial Prelature of Tefé, Catholic prelature in Brazil
Tefé Holland, DC Comics fictional character
Barão de Teffé (H-42), former Brazilian oceanographic research ship